The 1841 Pennsylvania gubernatorial election was between two candidates. Incumbent Governor David R. Porter ran for the Democratic Party, and defeated John Banks.

Results

References

1841
Pennsylvania
Gubernatorial
November 1841 events